Sorin Daniel Strătilă (born 20 October 1986) is a Romanian footballer who plays as a right midfielder for Liga III club CSM Focșani.

Club career

Early career 

Strătilă signed his first professional contract in July 2005, with Euro Africa Football School from Buşteni. He was then loaned to some smaller teams like Inter Gaz București and Royal Ghimbav.

Steaua II București 

He was bought to Steaua's second team in 2008, but later he was released, under the spell of Marius Lăcătuş who considered the Strătilă could not ever be a good player. To get rid of him, even if the player had the support of the ownership, Lăcătuş claimed that he was too old for the first team. The coach said that he didn't need a 25-year-old player, though Strătilă was only 21 at that time.

Astra Ploieşti 

In the Summer of 2009, Strătilă arrived at Astra Ploieşti as a free agent. He soon became a first team player and in August 2011 he was call to the national team.

Dinamo București 

In January 2012, Strătilă was transferred to Dinamo București. He signed a contract for four years, until December 2015. Strătilă scored his first goal for Dinamo in a game against FC Vaslui, on 18 May 2013. Dinamo lost that match, 4–1.

Loan to Concordia Chiajna 

In August 2013, Strătilă was loaned out at fellow Liga I team Concordia Chiajna.

UTA 
In 2014, Strătilă was released by Dinamo and in October he signed a contract with UTA, in Liga III.

International career 

He made his debut for Romania on 10 August 2011, against San Marino.

Honours

Club
Dinamo București
Romanian Cup: 2011–12
 Romanian Supercup: 2012

References

External links
 
 

1986 births
Living people
Sportspeople from Brașov
Romanian footballers
Association football midfielders
Romania international footballers
Liga I players
Liga II players
FC Brașov (1936) players
FC Steaua II București players
FC Astra Giurgiu players
FC Dinamo București players
CS Concordia Chiajna players
FC UTA Arad players
CSM Focșani players